Cantinflas (Mario Moreno, 1911–1993) was a Mexican comic film actor

Mario Moreno may also refer to:

 Mario Anguiano Moreno (born 1962), Mexican politician and member of the Institutional Revolutionary Party
 Mario Moreno (footballer) (1935–2005), Chilean footballer
 Mario Antonio Moreno (born 1986), Mexican footballer
 Mario Moreno Zazueta (born 1942), painter, etcher and art professor
 Mario Moreno Arcos, Mexican politician and former mayor of Chilpancingo de los Bravo, Guerrero